Howard Lovecraft and the Undersea Kingdom is a 2017 animated direct-to-video film based on the graphic novel of the same name. The inspiration comes from the writings of American horror author H. P. Lovecraft. The sequel to 2016 film Howard Lovecraft and the Frozen Kingdom, itself was followed by sequel Howard Lovecraft and the Kingdom of Madness in 2018.

Plot 
After the events of the Frozen Kingdom, Howard Lovecraft is now home.

A terrible curse is placed upon his loved ones and he must travel to the Undersea Kingdom in order to free his mother who has been captured by an old foe. On his quest he gains help from Dr. Armitage, his father Winfield, and his best friend Spot.

Production 
On January 18, 2017, it was announced that Mark Hamill, Christopher Plummer and Jeffrey Combs and Doug Bradley would be joining the voice cast in this animated feature. Mark Hamill was cast as Dr. Henry Armitage while Christopher Plummer and Doug Bradley reprise their roles as Dr. Herbert West and Nyarlathotep.

Shout! Factory had acquired the distribution rights to the series including theatrical, digital, broadcast, home entertainment.

Cast 

Christopher Plummer - Dr. West
Mark Hamill - Dr. Henry Armitage
Kiefer O'Reilly - Howard Lovecraft
Jeffrey Combs - King Abdul
Ron Perlman - Shoggoth
Scott McNeil - Dagon/Govlins
Doug Bradley - Nyarlathotep
Sean Patrick O'Reilly - Spot
Harmony O'Reilly - Innes
Michelle O'Reilly - Sarah Lovecraft
Phoenix O'Reilly - Twi'i
Summer O'Reilly - Gotha
Tyler Nicol - Winfield Lovecraft

Release  
The film was released on October 1, 2017.

It also was screened at H.P. Lovecraft Film Festival in Oregon, FearNYC Film Festival and Hot Springs International Horror Film Festival.

Home media 
Howard Lovecraft and the Undersea Kingdom was released on DVD and Blu-ray on December 5, 2017 by Shout! Factory which is a part of their three feature distribution deal with Arcana Studio.

Reception

Critical response 
Rotten Tomatoes has an approval rating of 40% and it has a weighted average vote of 7.5/10 out of 392 votes on IMDb.

Critics says "Howard Lovecraft and the Undersea Kingdom does a lot of things right; it’s fun, packed with high adventure, and manages to soften the Lovecraft mythos to make it palatable to younger viewers (...) the story is muddy in some areas with a myriad of story points going on simultaneously over a rather short runtime". 
Fans and viewers of the film praised the voice talent of the movie but have criticized about the quality of the animation in the film

Accolades 
The film took home Best in the Festival: Scifi at Hot Springs International Horror Film Festival and Best Director at FearNYC.

References

External links 
 
 

2017 films
2017 computer-animated films
Animated films based on comics
Arcana Studio titles
Canadian animated feature films
Canadian sequel films
Cthulhu Mythos films
Films based on Canadian comics
Films directed by Sean Patrick O'Reilly
2010s English-language films
2010s Canadian films